Hugh Flavin is an Irish hurler who played as a centre-forward for the Limerick senior team.

Flavin joined the team during the 2007 National League and was a semi-regular member of the starting fifteen over the following two seasons. He enjoyed little success in the senior grade and was an unused substitute in Limerick's All-Ireland final defeat in 2007.

At club level Flavin plays with Croom.

Playing career

Club

Flavin plays his club hurling with Croom and has enjoyed some success.

In 2001 he lined out in a county under-21 championship decider. Ballybrown were the opponents, however, a comprehensive 1-12 to 0-4 victory gave Flavin an under-21 championship medal.

Inter-county

Flavin made his senior debut for Limerick in a National League game against Antrim in 2007. He played a number of games during that campaign and was subsequently included on Limerick's championship panel, making his debut in a Munster semi-final defeat of Tipperary.  Flavin was an unused substitute for Limerick during their 2-19 to 1-15 defeat by Kilkenny in the 2007 All-Ireland final.

Flavin played a number of National League games for Limerick again in 2008, however, he left the panel after that year's championship.

Honours

Team
Croom
Limerick Under-21 Club Hurling Championship (1): 2001

References

1981 births
Living people
Croom hurlers
Limerick inter-county hurlers